The Telescope is a 1963 oil on canvas painting by René Magritte.

The painting depicts a window through which a partly clouded blue sky can be seen. However, the right side of the window is partially open, revealing a black background where the viewer would expect to see a continuation of the clouds and sky.

References

Paintings by René Magritte
1963 paintings